Great Lake Warriors is an American and Canadian reality television series on History that premiered on July 19, 2012.

Premise
The show follows the lives of a number of tugboat sailors in the Great Lakes region. The show features Calumet Fleeting, Heritage Marine, and Thunder Bay Tug Services. The companies are located in Duluth, Minnesota, South Chicago, Illinois, and Thunder Bay, Ontario, respectively.

Episodes

References

2010s American reality television series
2012 American television series debuts
English-language television shows
History (American TV channel) original programming
2012 American television series endings